Norbert Altenkamp (born 27 July 1972) is a German politician of the Christian Democratic Union (CDU) who has been serving as a member of the Bundestag since 2017. He previously served as mayor of Bad Soden.

Early life and education 
Altenkamp was born in Marl, North Rhine-Westphalia. After his Abitur, he took up an apprenticeship as a bank teller at Dresdner Bank in Essen, followed by studying economics at the University of Münster.

Political career 

Altenkamp entered the CDU in 1990. From 2004 to 2017, he was mayor of Bad Soden. He was first elected in 2003 with 63.3% of the vote and was re-elected in 2009 and 2015.

He has since been serving on the Committee on Education, Research and Technology Assessment and the Committee on Human Rights and Humanitarian Aid. In this capacity, he is the CDU/CSU parliamentary group's rapporteur on the immigration of skilled workers and on tax incentives for research and development.

Other activities 
 Süwag Energie, Member of the Advisory Board (since 2015)
 Taunus Sparkasse, Member of the Supervisory Board (since 2011)
 Kliniken des Main-Taunus-Kreises, Member of the Advisory Board (since 2016)

Personal life 
Altenkamp is married and has two children, and currently resides in Bad Soden.

References

External links 

Personal website

Living people
1972 births
Members of the Bundestag for Hesse
Members of the Bundestag 2017–2021
Members of the Bundestag 2021–2025
Members of the Bundestag for the Christian Democratic Union of Germany